Călugareni may refer to several villages in Romania:

 Călugareni, Arad, a village in Felnac, Arad
 Călugareni, Bacău, a village in Dămienești Commune, Bacău County